Jake Allen may refer to:

Jake Allen (American football) (born 1985),  American football wide receiver
Jake Allen (ice hockey) (born 1990), Canadian professional ice hockey goaltender
Jake Allen (speedway rider), Australian speedway rider
Jake Allen, co-writer of Brownsville (with Neil Kleid)
Jake Allen, fictional character in Final Crisis: Revelations